QTS may refer to:

 Qualified Teacher Status
 Quality Technology Services
 Quileute Tribal School